The Green-Eyed Blonde is a 1957 American drama film directed by Bernard Girard and written by Dalton Trumbo, a blacklisted Hollywood screenwriter; the script was credited to his front, Sally Stubblefield. The film stars Susan Oliver, Melinda Plowman, Beverly Long, Norma Jean Nilsson, Tommie Moore and Carla Merey. The film was released by Warner Bros. on December 14, 1957.

Plot

Maggie Wilson joins the staff of a California institution for wayward girls, run by the stern Mrs. Nichols. A new arrival, Betsy Abel, hates her mother and has a two-month-old baby of her own, refusing to identify the father.

"Greeneyes", one of the girls, is due to be released in a few weeks. Her boyfriend Cliff is a former drug addict, determined to stay clean. The girls at the institution bond, particularly when Betsy's mother visits, threatening to put the baby up for adoption unless Betsy names the father so he can pay for the baby's support. The mother is unaware her own boyfriend impregnated her daughter.

The girls kidnap the child and care for it in secret. Maggie finally finds the baby, and lets them keep it through Christmas, but once Mrs. Nichols has it taken away, the girls start a full-scale riot. Greeneyes is given a six-month extension to her sentence, against Maggie's recommendation. Greeneyes escapes, but when  Cliff and she are chased by police, they are killed.

Cast

References

External links
 
 
 
 

1957 films
Warner Bros. films
American drama films
1957 drama films
Films scored by Leith Stevens
1950s English-language films
Films directed by Bernard Girard
1950s American films